During the Russian Civil War, the Far Eastern part of the former Russian Empire was a battleground for violence between the Russian SFSR and the remnants of the Russian State. The fighting in this front expanded from Outer Mongolia, through Eastern Siberia, and in the Ussuri and Amur districts of Outer Manchuria in Russia.

Combatants
The fighting forces on the Communist side were the Red Army, Kuban Cossacks, Communist Mongolian militias, and the Far Eastern Republic. On the White side, there were local White Army units, pro-white Mongolian militias, Mongolian government forces, and the Beiyang Army. Allied intervention forces arrived which included 70,000 Imperial Japanese soldiers and 10,000 US Marines.

The Japanese goals
During the October Revolution, the Japanese were already gaining influence in Chinese Manchuria. They were surprised when the Bolsheviks successfully took power in Russia. While the Americans were interested in supporting Kolchak's White government, the Japanese aimed to take over Russian ports and coastal territories. In 1918, Japan occupied Vladivostok with the United States Marines.
The Japanese had plans of rapid expansion starting in Amur and Ussuri River region all the way to Lake Baikal. In response to the Russians' establishment of the Far Eastern Republic, the Japanese backed the Provisional Priamurye Government.

The U.S. aims
The United States was interested in helping Admiral Kolchak's government in Siberia, which was in need of aid.
They wanted to press the Red Army out of Siberia and allow the White Army to establish control of Russia and defeat the Bolsheviks. A major contributing factor was the United States government fears that communism would spread through the U.S if the Bolsheviks won the civil war.

Communist/Bolshevik Response
The Bolshevik effort in the Far East was the same as on the other fronts: to retake or hold on to territory of the former Russian Empire. The goal of the Russian SFSR was to stop the Allied advance into Siberia. The Soviets set up the Far Eastern Republic as a buffer state to hold off the White and allied armies.

Mongolia
The war expanded into Mongolia as White armies in the far east retreated. While others retreated to Japan or China, some tried to hold on to Mongolia which was a Czarist allied state. As the war dragged on, Mongolians were forced to take sides. Some joined the Communists, either by entering their armies or forming militias to help fight the Whites. Others went with the Whites, as part of the puppet government's forces or militias. The Communists burned Buddhist temples and killed white supporters to terrify Mongolians into joining them, and the Whites used similar tactics.

Aftermath
In the aftermath, the Whites were forced into exile. The Americans left Siberia and the Russian Far East in 1920. Japan held it even after the Whites were defeated, and would not withdraw until October 1922. With the war over, the Soviet government in Russia got to keep all of Russia's pre-war territories in the Far East. Future clashes over territory in the region would continue into the next decade, as seen during the Battle of Lake Khasan in 1938 and the Battles of Khalkhin Gol in 1939.

Sources
 Atlas of world war one Publisher Author Unknown
 Atlas of world war two Publisher unknown Author Unknown
 Conflict of the Twentieth Century World War One Publisher Fraklin Watts
 Conflict of the Twentieth Century World War Two Publisher Franklin Watts
 Conflict of the Twentieth Century Rise of dictators 1919 -1939
 Franklin watts library edition

Russian Civil War
History of the Russian Far East
Allied intervention in the Russian Civil War